The Thiotrichaceae are a family of Pseudomonadota, including Thiomargarita namibiensis, the largest known bacterium. Some species are movable by gliding, Thiospira by using flagella.

References

External links
 Thiotrichaceae J.P. Euzéby: List of Prokaryotic names with Standing in Nomenclature

Thiotrichales